All She Wrote may refer to:

 "All She Wrote" (Ross Copperman song), 2007
 "All She Wrote" (FireHouse song), 1991
 "All She Wrote" (Six60 song), 2021
 Alternative title of the Chaka Demus & Pliers album Tease Me, 1993

See also
 That's All She Wrote (disambiguation)